Sierra Leone House of Parliament  is the meeting place of the Parliament of Sierra Leone, the legislative body of the Republic of Sierra Leone. It is located at Tower Hill in central Freetown, within the central business district in downtown Freetown. At the entrance of the House of Parliament is located the historic Martello Tower. 

The State House, the official workplace of the president of Sierra Leone, and the Sierra Leone Ministry of Defence and National Security building are located near the House of Parliament.

Security
The House of Parliament is protected by the Sierra Leone Police. Only permitted individuals and vehicles are allowed to enter the House of Parliament.

External links
http://reliefweb.int/node/328493
http://www.statehouse.gov.sl/index.php?option=com_content&view=article&id=424:president-koroma-addresses-parliament-&catid=34:news-articles
http://www.tabletmag.com/jewish-arts-and-culture/120587/al-aqsa-of-africa

Buildings and structures in Freetown
Seats of national legislatures
Government buildings in Sierra Leone